Simplexvirus is a genus of viruses in the order Herpesvirales, in the family Herpesviridae, in the subfamily Alphaherpesvirinae. Humans and mammals serve as natural hosts. Diseases associated with this genus include skin vesicles or mucosal ulcers, rarely encephalitis, and meningitis.

Species
The following 15 species are assigned to the genus:

 Ateline alphaherpesvirus 1
 Bovine alphaherpesvirus 2
 Cercopithecine alphaherpesvirus 2
 Human alphaherpesvirus 1
 Human alphaherpesvirus 2
 Leporid alphaherpesvirus 4
 Macacine alphaherpesvirus 1
 Macacine alphaherpesvirus 2
 Macacine alphaherpesvirus 3
 Macropodid alphaherpesvirus 1
 Macropodid alphaherpesvirus 2
 Panine alphaherpesvirus 3
 Papiine alphaherpesvirus 2
 Pteropodid alphaherpesvirus 1
 Saimiriine alphaherpesvirus 1

Structure 
Viruses in Simplexvirus are enveloped, with icosahedral, spherical to pleomorphic, and  round geometries, and T=16 symmetry. The diameter is around 150-200 nm. Genomes are linear and unsegmented, around 152kb in length.

Lifecycle 
Viral replication is nuclear, and is lysogenic. Entry into the host cell is achieved by attachment of the viral gB, gC, gD, and gH proteins to host receptors, which mediates endocytosis. Replication follows the dsDNA bidirectional replication model. DNA-templated transcription, with some alternative splicing mechanism, is the method of transcription. Translation takes place by leaky scanning. The virus exits the host cell by nuclear egress, budding, and microtubular outwards viral transport.
Human and mammals serve as the natural hosts. Transmission routes are sexual, contact, and saliva.

References

External links 

 Viralzone: Simplexvirus
 ICTV

 
Virus genera